Paromoeocerus barbicornis is a species of beetle in the family Cerambycidae. It was described by Johan Christian Fabricius in 1792.

References

Unxiini
Beetles described in 1792